Bagaman Island is an island of Papua New Guinea, part of the Calvados Chain within the Louisiade Archipelago.  Misima language is the native language on the island.

References

Islands of Milne Bay Province
Louisiade Archipelago